Illowra Battery is a former Australian Army coastal-artillery battery located at Hill 60, Port Kembla, New South Wales in Australia, built and in service during World War II. It was also otherwise known as Hill 60 Battery.

History 

Two large naval-gun emplacements were constructed, both housing British BL 6-inch Mk. XI guns and complete with their protective gun-shields formerly held in storage from the decommissioned World War I-era Australian Navy cruisers HMAS Brisbane, Sydney and HMAS Melbourne. Two large tunnels were built to support the gun-battery and are steep in its descent underground and is fitted with a small-gauge tram/trolleyway used for hauling the guns' shells to their breeches located at the two coastal-gun emplacements above.

Aside from the two tunnels, a concrete bunker was also built and is connected to the tunnel system.

Illowra Battery was abandoned shortly after the end of World War II in 1945. A mushroom farm was established in its main bunker complex due to the cool temperature and adequate humidity within for the growing of such edible fungi. Today, the site remains popular with local visitors as well as urban explorers, who have added much colourful and diverse graffiti to the old battery's walls and remnants.

References 

Batteries in Australia
Buildings and structures in Wollongong
Bunkers in Oceania
Forts in New South Wales